Guatteria anomala is a species of plant in the Annonaceae family. It is found in El Salvador, Guatemala, and Mexico. It is threatened by habitat loss.

References

 World Conservation Monitoring Centre 1998.  Guatteria anomala.   2006 IUCN Red List of Threatened Species.   Downloaded on 21 August 2007.

anomala
Flora of El Salvador
Flora of Guatemala
Flora of Campeche
Flora of Chiapas
Flora of Tabasco
Flora of Veracruz
Near threatened plants
Taxonomy articles created by Polbot